Passiflora ampullacea is a species of plant in the family Passifloraceae. The vine is endemic to Ecuador. It is an IUCN Red List threatened species.

References

ampullacea
Endemic flora of Ecuador
Vulnerable flora of South America
Taxonomy articles created by Polbot